David Thompson (born ) is a professional rugby league footballer who last played as a er for Whitehaven in Betfred League 1.

He previously played for Hull Kingston Rovers and in the reserve team at Warrington Wolves.

He has played for the Leigh Centurions in the Super League and in March 2017 he became available to play for Whitehaven on Dual registration after the club signed a deal with Leigh.

In November 2017 his move to Whitehaven was made permanent with a deal for the 2018 season.

References

External links
Whitehaven profile
Leigh Centurions profile

1995 births
Living people
Rugby league wingers
Leigh Leopards players
Hull Kingston Rovers players
Warrington Wolves players
Whitehaven R.L.F.C. players
Sheffield Eagles players